Manikkal  is a village in Thiruvananthapuram district in the state of Kerala, India.

Demographics
 India census, Manikkal had a population of 18632 with 8861 males and 9771 females.

References

Villages in Thiruvananthapuram district